The Tattooed Man is the name of two of Green Lantern's enemies, as well as of one related character.

A version of the Tattooed Man called Tattoo Man appeared as a recurring character in the Arrowverse television series Black Lightning, portrayed by William Catlett. This version of the character was named Latavius "Lala" Johnson.

Publication history 
The first Tattooed Man first appeared in Green Lantern (vol. 2) #23 (September 1963) and was created by Gardner Fox and Gil Kane.

Fictional character biography

Abel Tarrant
Abel Tarrant was a sailor based in Coast City who turned to burglary. During one of his heists, he was exposed to a bunch of mysterious chemicals which left him with the mental ability to create actual objects from the chemicals. When he got back from the robbery, he tattooed himself using the chemicals so he would always have the chemicals near him. Some of the shapes he was able to conjure from his tattoos were an axe, shield, cannon, and dragon. The Tattooed Man originally had the advantage against Green Lantern because the chemicals' base was yellow (though the tattoos themselves were usually shown as purple). The Emerald Gladiator eventually beat the Tattooed Man by making him concentrate on more than one of his tattoos. The Tattooed Man would return, however, as a member of the Injustice Gang. While previously he had tattooed only his arms (that he may hide them under a shirt), by this point he has tattooed much of his body, including his face. Tarrant would fall along with the rest of the Injustice Gang, and his activities would remain mysterious for some time. Tarrant was eventually thought murdered by the Goldface mafia for trying to con them. Obviously surviving, years later he would reform as a tattoo artist involuntarily being forced to battle Guy Gardner.

Tattooed Man later appeared at the funeral for Hal Jordan.

Still later, he would attend the funeral of former Injustice Gang teammate David Clinton, aka Chronos. While Clinton left Tarrant his 1965 Mustang, what he really wanted was Clinton's time travel equipment. Forcing the secret of time travel out of Walker Gabriel, he unsuccessfully attempted to dissuade himself from becoming the Tattooed Man, before Walker dragged him back to the present.

He made an appearance in Villains United: Infinite Crisis Special #1 trying to escape from Alcatraz only to be stopped by Arsenal.

He resurfaced as a member of the Suicide Squad saying that despite his attempted reform, he could not escape his past and was upset the new Tattooed Man had been accepted into the Society. He was apparently killed by Mirror Master and Jewelee when it turned out that he betrayed the Squad to the Society and caused the death of Jewelee's husband and partner-in-crime Punch.

In the Watchmen sequel Doomsday Clock, Tarrant is among the villains that attend the underground meeting held by Riddler that talks about the Superman Theory. He states that Sanctuary "screwed up" Mark Richards.

John Oakes
The second Tattooed Man was John Oakes, the main character of the Vertigo series Skin Graft: The Adventures of a Tattooed Man by Jerry Prosser and Warren Pleece. Oakes first appeared in Skin Graft #1 (July 1993).

A cellmate of Abel Tarrant, John Oakes learned the art of tattoo - with a supernatural edge - from his fellow prisoner. After being released from jail, Oakes learned that his strange tattoos were a curse as well as a blessing as his tattoos now opened arcane 'doors' and could involuntarily trap people as 'tattoos' on his own body. Further studying for the Irezumi master Kobo in Kyoto, Oakes learned to control his strange abilities, and finally defeated both Tarrant and the 'tattoo killer' Mizoguchi Kenji by absorbing them. However, Oakes' beloved Yuko died in the battle as well, which prompted him to make her part of his own self.

Mark Richards
The third Tattooed Man first appeared in Green Lantern (vol. 4) #9. Mark Richards was a former U.S. Marine who went missing after his helicopter crashed a few years ago. He was presumed dead until he showed up in Gotham City as a hit man. He claimed that the tattoos covering his body were the sins of men he had killed and that by the art of "sin-grafting", which he had learned from the nation of Modora, in which he takes the sins of others and puts them on himself, he claimed to be redeeming the men and women he killed. All his victims had tattoos of their sins. He was eventually stopped by Green Lantern and Batman.

In Infinite Crisis, Mark becomes a member of the Society.

He appears as one of a group of villains seeking to avoid being sent to the prison planet.

In Trinity, reality is altered by the removal of Superman, Batman, and Wonder Woman. In this world, Morgaine Le Fay's recruits, the Dreambound, recruit Richards to replace one of their fallen number. He becomes Sun-Chained-In-Ink and gains the ability to control the awesome powers of the sun itself: heat, light, and gravity. As the series progresses, Richards comes to dislike the Dreambound, deeming them "losers". Reality eventually begins returning to normal and the original Sun-Chained-In-Ink is resurrected, severing Richards from his new powers. He still allies himself with Le Fey and Despero when the Crime Syndicate attacks.

In Final Crisis, he is first seen taking Metropolis detective Dan Turpin to the entrance to the Dark Side Club. In the fourth issue, he and his family are Anti-Life survivors, hiding in an abandoned school from Darkseid's Justifiers. His wife sends out a signal to be rescued by the surviving heroes. Black Lightning shows up to save them and, before being captured, asks Mark to deliver "The Circuit" to the Hall of Justice. While his family is taken to a Checkmate Watchtower, he joins up with the survivors in the Hall where he tattoos the circuit on his skin, turning it silver with symbols reminiscent of the New God Metron. In the sixth issue, Mark is on the JLA satellite with the other survivors. Looking down on the earth with wonder, Mark resolves to never again take his powers for granted, prompting Black Canary to make him an honorary member of the Justice League. The satellite is then attacked by Justifiers and the brainwashed Black Lightning, and Mark discovers that the circuit protects him from the effects of the Anti-Life Equation.

In Final Crisis Aftermath: Ink, Richards is shown attempting to be a hero in his Washington D.C. neighborhood, Liberty Hill. He clashes with the neighborhood's gangs and crooked cops while also trying to keep his family together. Meanwhile, two of his tattoos, a samurai named Kabuki Dan and a demoness named Altera, come to life and begin acting without Richards' consent. This is revealed to be the result of the supervillain behind the gangs and the cops: Sync, Richards' own brother who everyone thought long dead. Eventually, Richards realizes Altera and Kabuki Dan are just aspects of his own mind. Working together, the three of them are able to confuse Sync's mind control powers and beat him.

In DC's Brightest Day event, Mark appears as a member of Deathstroke's new team of Titans He is convinced to join by Deathstroke who offers to help him track down Slipknot, the person responsible for murdering his son. After a breakout at Arkham Asylum, Richards was about to leave his team until Deathstroke reveals that he has captured Slipknot for him. Deathstroke allows the two to fight to the death, with Richards winning after he beheads Slipknot. After this act, Richards quits Deathstroke's team, declaring that he is done with killing. When Richards returns to Liberty Hill, he discovers his old neighborhood is afraid of him and the gangbangers have forced citizens and even the police themselves to clean up the area. His former assistant explains to him that they have taken control of the community and made a fortune for themselves through crime. Richards was then confronted by Vixen who believed that he was responsible for the acts of violence committed by his former thugs. Vixen rescinds her offer of Justice League membership and attacks Richards. After a brutal fight, Vixen willingly surrenders and Richards agrees to leave her and take care of his neighborhood in his own way. Richards later rejoins Deathstroke's Titans. Upon returning to the labyrinth, Deathstroke reveals to them that the items the Titans collected were used to form a healing machine called the "Methuselah Device", intended to restore his dying son, Jericho. After healing Jericho, Deathstroke declares that the machine can also resurrect the dead, including Richards' son. Richards initially accepts but after Cinder declares the Methuselah Device a curse, he joins her and Arsenal in fighting the other Titans to destroy it. After Cinder sacrifices herself to destroy the Methuselah Device, Richards returns home.

In 2011, DC Comics rebooted the DC Universe as part of "The New 52". During the Forever Evil storyline, Tattooed Man appears as a member of the Crime Syndicate of America's incarnation of the Secret Society of Super Villains. In the aftermath of the Crime Syndicate's defeat, he was seen with its members when the Justice League apprehend them.

During the Heroes in Crisis storyline, Tattooed Man is shown as a patient at Sanctuary. He was among those killed when Wally West lost control of the Speed Force that was caused by Savitar enough to unleash an explosive blast.

In the Watchmen sequel Doomsday Clock, Abel Tarrant mentioned what happened to Mark at the villain meeting.

Powers and abilities
Each of the Tattooed Man versions can bring their tattoos to life.

Collected editions
Final Crisis: Submit one-shot
Crisis Aftermath: Ink (collects Crisis Aftermath: Ink #1-6)
Titans: Villains for Hire (collects Titans (vol. 2) #24-27 and Titans: Villains for Hire Special #1)

Other versions

Flashpoint
In the alternate timeline of the Flashpoint event, Tattooed Man is a member of Deathstroke's pirates. After ambush by Aquaman and Ocean Master, Tattooed Man was stabbed by Ocean Master's spear. As Scavenger opens fire on Aquaman he dodges and the blaster shreds Tattooed Man.

Similar characters
 A woman named "Tattoo" appeared in the comic book Aztek as part of a Lex Luthor-funded group named "Dial V for Villain". She displayed powers similar to Abel Tarrant's.

 A non-powered thug named "Tattoo" appears as member of the False Face Society. 

 A young girl named "Pix" appeared in Batman: Gotham Knights. Her powers were virtually identical to those of the Tattooed Man, but her powers were nanotechnological in origin rather than chemical exposure. Ariadne Pixnit is an avant-garde artist who used nanobots in paints to program them to form what she wanted. After being beaten and raped by a gang of street thugs, Pinxit disguised herself as a tattoo shop worker, designing lethal tattoos that she brings to "life" via computer to kill all the gang members.

 A character named "Abel Terror" represents a circus tattooed man in the Freakshow expansion of the game Horrorclix.

 During the New 52, a woman named "Tats" battles Power Girl.

In other media

Television
 The Abel Tarrant incarnation of Tattooed Man makes non-speaking cameo appearances in Justice League Unlimited as a member of Gorilla Grodd's Secret Society.
 The Mark Richards incarnation of Tattooed Man appears in the Batman: The Brave and the Bold episode "Scorn of the Star Sapphire!", voiced by Michael Jai White.
 An original incarnation of Tattooed Man named Latavius "Lala" Johnson / Tattoo Man appears in Black Lightning, portrayed by William Catlett. Introduced in the first season, this version is a former student of the titular character and member of the 100 under Tobias Whale. After repeatedly failing to kill Black Lightning, Whale kills Lala and reanimates him with help from Lady Eve, who provides Whale the means to control Lala. As a side effect, the latter sees the ghosts of those he killed, whose faces are forcibly tattooed onto him. Whale later uses Lala as a bomb mule in a failed attempt at killing A.S.A. agent Martin Proctor, though Lala is resurrected once more in the second season with help from Lazarus Prime, a coroner with a grudge against Whale. Lala tries to seek revenge on Whale, but is forced to serve him once more when Whale uses his tattoos to incapacitate him. In the third season, Lala gains control of the 100's remnants and mounts another revenge attempt on Whale, only to fall under Lady Eve's control. As of the fourth season, Lala has assumed leadership of the 100.

Film
 The Abel Tarrant incarnation of Tattooed Man was reportedly featured in David S. Goyer's script for an unproduced Green Arrow film project titled Escape from Super Max.
 The Flashpoint incarnation of Tattooed Man makes a cameo appearance in Justice League: The Flashpoint Paradox.
 A character loosely inspired by Tattooed Man called Monster T appears in Suicide Squad, portrayed by Common. This version is a henchman of the Joker, who later kills T for making covetous comments about Harley Quinn.

Miscellaneous
 The Abel Tarrant incarnation of Tattooed Man appears in issue #4 of the Green Lantern: The Animated Series tie-in comic. This version's tattoos were created from radioactive ink.
 The Mark Richards incarnation of Tattooed Man appears in DC Super Hero Girls as a background student of Super Hero High.

References

Comics characters introduced in 1963
Comics characters introduced in 1993
Comics characters introduced in 2006
DC Comics supervillains
Fictional African-American people
Fictional sailors
Vertigo Comics titles
Fictional United States Marine Corps personnel
DC Comics metahumans
Characters created by Gardner Fox